Get Revenge is a 2020 South Korean television series starring Kim Sa-rang and Yoon Hyun-min. The series directed by Kang Min-gu for Chosun Broadcasting Company, is a revenge story of Kang Hae-ra (played by Kim Sa-rang) against those who rule society.

The series was premiered on TV Chosun on November 21, 2020 and was broadcast on Saturday and Sunday at 21.00 KST till January 17, 2021. The first episode of the series logged an average viewership nationwide ratings of 3.4%, peaking to 4.1%. Whereas the second and third episodes logged nationwide viewership ratings of 3.7% with the same peak rating of 4.1%.

Synopsis
It is a mysterious social revenge drama that follows Kang Hae-ra (played by Kim Sa-rang) and her revenge against those who rule society. She is a trendy influencer reporter until a phony scandal ruins her. She vows a revenge on those who hurt her.

Cast

Main
 Kim Sa-rang as Kang Hae-ra, a reporter and influencer, however due to a false scandal she loses all, so she aims to take revenge on those who rule society in a corrupt way.
 Yoon Hyun-min as Cha Min-joon, a lawyer who has never lost a single case. After his family is thrown into ruin, he chooses to take revenge no matter what it takes. Her sister Mi-yeon, gets caught in a sponsor scandal and goes missing, and then he becomes  a lawyer rather than a doctor, (though while attending medical school he had  a 100% win rate), to find her sister.

Supporting
 Yoon So-yi as Ku Eun-hye,	she takes over her father's detective agency. She is devoted to her work and result oriented person.
 Yoo Sun as Kim tae-ohn, only heir to the "FB" group that does not stop at anything in order to inherit the company. She is a ruthless chaebol.
 Jung Man-sik as Kim Sang-gu, father of Kim Tae-ohn, a man who has no affection for his only daughter and only thinks of growing his company.
 Park Eun-hye as Cha Mi-yeon, Min-joon's older sister, former FBC announcer. An incumbent announcer, a person who was engulfed by a sponsor scandal, making the broadcaster bustle.  
 Jung Wook as Lee Hoon-seok
 Jang Yoo-sang as Choi Do-yoon, Cha Min-joon secretary and his right arm
 Baek Seung-hee as Song Seon-mi	
 Kong Hyun-joo as reporter
 Jung Eui-jae
 Song Joo-hee as Secretary Yeon
 Seo Ye-hwa as Happy Credit person
 Hong Hyun-hee as Director Hong
Special appearance
 Jung Hyeon-jun as Igaon Son of Kang Hae-ra and Lee Hoon-seok, currently studying in Canada.

Production
In July 2020, Park Eun-hye was confirmed to star in the series.
 In August 2020, Song Joo-hee was cast in the series.

The first reading of the script took place on October 20, 2020. The crew underlined the theme of series as: "It is a drama that provides strong one-shot revenge to those who use the weak regardless of means, with the title of "'Revenge" as the strongest."

Original soundtrack

Part 1

Part 2

Part 3

Part 4

Part 5

Part 6

Part 7

Part 8

Part 9

Part 10

Part 11

Viewership
The first episode of the series logged an average nationwide ratings of 3.4% in viewership, peaking to 4.1%.

Notes

References

External links
  
 Get Revenge at Daum 
 
 

Korean-language television shows
2020 South Korean television series debuts
TV Chosun television dramas
South Korean suspense television series
Television series by Chorokbaem Media
Television series about revenge
South Korean mystery television series
Television series by Blossom Entertainment
2021 South Korean television series endings
Television series by Story Hunter Production